Fort Plain Historic District is a national historic district located at Fort Plain in Montgomery County, New York.  When first listed it encompassed 536 contributing buildings, 2 contributing sites, 1 contributing structure, and 2 contributing objects in the central business district and surrounding residential sections of the village of Fort Plain.  It developed between about 1786 and 1938, and included notable examples of Federal, Greek Revival, Gothic Revival, Italianate, Second Empire, Queen Anne, and Beaux-Arts style architecture. Located in the district is the separately listed United States Post Office. Other notable contributing resources include the Red Mill (c. 1860), Firemen's Home (c. 1830-1840), Methodist Church (1880), Baptist Church (1896), Reformed Church (1887), high school (1915), Nellis Memorial Chapel, Watkins Block (1936), Montgomery Hall (c. 1900), Wick Block (c. 1890), Village Hall (c. 1875), and Fort Plain Cemetery (est. c. 1850).

It was added to the National Register of Historic Places in 2012, with a boundary increase in 2022.

References

Historic districts on the National Register of Historic Places in New York (state)
Greek Revival architecture in New York (state)
Italianate architecture in New York (state)
Gothic Revival architecture in New York (state)
Federal architecture in New York (state)
Queen Anne architecture in New York (state)
Beaux-Arts architecture in New York (state)
Buildings and structures in Montgomery County, New York
National Register of Historic Places in Montgomery County, New York